Dulwich College Suzhou (DCSZ) is a private international school located in Suzhou Industrial Park, Suzhou, China. The school has approximately 900 students from age 2 to 18 (Early Learning 1 to Year 13).

Dulwich College Suzhou is part of the Dulwich College International (DCI) network of schools. Dulwich College Suzhou was the third College to join the Dulwich family of schools in 2007. 

Dulwich College in London is one of the UK's oldest independent schools, founded in South London as a boys’ school in 1619.The Dulwich network currently provides for over 7,200 students in eight cities and five countries, with Colleges in London, two campuses in the Jinqiao and Minhang districts of Shanghai, in Beijing, Suzhou, Seoul, Singapore and Yangon and International High Schools in Suzhou and Zhuhai.

The College
Dulwich College Suzhou opened in August 2007. The primary teaching language is English, with a Dual Language approach in Mandarin and English in Kindergarten. From Kindergarten through to Year 9 they follow the National Curriculum of England and Wales, enhanced for international needs. In Year 10 students begin the two-year International GCSE syllabus followed by the International Baccalaureate Diploma Programme in Years 12 and 13.

DUCKS
The Dulwich Kindergarten, known as DUCKS, caters to the youngest students from Early Learning 1 to Year 2 (age 2 to 7 years).

Junior School
Junior School caters for students from ages 7 to 11.

Senior School
Senior School includes students from ages 11 to 18 where students follow the IGCSE syllabus and International Baccalaureate Programme (IBDP).

Headmaster and Administration
The first Headmaster of the school was Nicholas Magnus who was Headmaster for five years from the founding until 2012. Nicholas Magnus left to found Dulwich College Singapore which opened in August 2014. After the departure of Nicholas Magnus, John Todd was chosen as Headmaster and remained as so until 2017.

The following Headmaster of the school was Stuart Bridge, who joined the College in August 2013 as Head of the Senior School, becoming Headmaster in 2017. He left the College in June 2019, at the end of the 2018/19 Academic Year.

The current Headmaster of the school is Mike O'Connor, who became Headmaster in 2019, at the start of the 2019/20 Academic Year, and has been the headmaster since 13 August 2019.

Georgina Gray is Head of Junior School and Shirley Wang is Head of Ducks (Early Years). Mark Jones is the current Head of Senior School. 

The current administration of the Senior School goes as follows:

See also 

 Dulwich College Beijing
 Dulwich College
 Dulwich College Singapore
 Dulwich College Shanghai
 Dulwich International High School Suzhou

References

Further reading
"Suzhou Delwich British International School Obtains Approval" (Archive). China-Singapore Suzhou Industrial Park. Retrieved on 14 January 2015.

Educational institutions established in 2007
International Baccalaureate schools in China
Suzhou
High schools in Suzhou
International schools in Suzhou
British international schools in China
Association of China and Mongolia International Schools
Suzhou Industrial Park
2007 establishments in China